Wonder Woman: Original Motion Picture Soundtrack is the soundtrack to the film of the same name. 
The music is composed and arranged by Rupert Gregson-Williams. It was released on June 2, 2017, by WaterTower Music.

Rupert Gregson-Williams was hired to compose the film's music in November 2016. He is joined by Evan Jolly, Tom Howe, Paul Mounsey, and Andrew Kawczynski who provide additional music. The soundtrack was released on the same day as the film on CD, digital, and vinyl. The score also heavily samples "Is She with You?" theme from the film Batman v Superman: Dawn of Justice, which was written by Hans Zimmer and Junkie XL.

Australian singer Sia sang a song for the film, entitled "To Be Human", featuring English musician Labrinth. Written by Florence Welch and Rick Nowels, the song is featured on the soundtrack. The single was released on May 25, 2017.

Track listing

Music appearing in the film and not included on the soundtrack

Charts

References

External links
 Official site

2017 soundtrack albums
2010s film soundtrack albums
DC Extended Universe soundtracks
Film scores
WaterTower Music soundtracks
Wonder Woman (film series)
Wonder Woman in other media
Superhero film soundtracks